Ildefonso Mendoza Segovia (born September 21, 1975) is a Mexican football manager and former player. He was born in Mexico City.

References

External links

Footballers from San Luis Potosí
1975 births
Living people
Association football midfielders
Tampico Madero F.C. footballers
Mexican footballers